Luis Carmona (15 February 1923 – 7 November 2019) was a Chilean modern pentathlete. He competed at the 1952 Summer Olympics.

References

External links
 

1923 births
2019 deaths
Chilean male modern pentathletes
Modern pentathletes at the 1952 Summer Olympics
Olympic modern pentathletes of Chile
20th-century Chilean people